Manasseh Dawes (died 1829) was an English barrister and miscellaneous writer.

Life
Dawes was a barrister of the Inner Temple. He left the bar and lived quietly at Clifford's Inn for the last thirty-six years of his life. He died 2 April 1829.

Works
Dawes took the Whig side on the American War of Independence, and the law of libel; but defended William Blackstone against Jeremy Bentham, had doubts as to abolishing tests, and held that philosophical truth was beyond reach. His major works were:

'Letter to Lord Chatham on American Affairs,' 1777 (in the title-page he describes himself as author of 'several anonymous pieces ').
'Essay on Intellectual Liberty,' 1780; it criticised Jeremy Bentham's 'Fragment'.
'Philosophical Considerations', on the controversy between Joseph Priestley and Richard Price, 1780.
'Nature and Extent of Supreme Power', on John Locke's 'Social Compact', 1783.
'England's Alarm, or the prevailing Doctrine of Libels,' 1785.
'Deformity of the Doctrine of Libels,' 1785; this and the previous work refer to the Case of the Dean of St Asaph.
'Introduction to a Knowledge of the Law on Real Estates,' 1814.
'Epitome of the Law of Landed Property,' 1818.

Dawes also edited (1784) a posthumous poem by John Stuckey on 'The Vanity of all Human Knowledge,' with a dedication to Priestley.

References

Attribution

Year of birth missing
1829 deaths
19th-century English writers
English barristers
Members of the Inner Temple